Steven Hanft (born May 1966) is a director, filmmaker, and photographer.

Early life
Steven Paul Hanft was born in Ventura, California where he started making films at the age of eleven.
He studied film at CalArts, where he made his first feature film, Kill the Moonlight.

Career
Hanft is best known for directing music videos for the Cure, Primal Scream, Delinquent Habits, and Beck, most notably "Loser" and "Where It's At", the latter of which won the MTV Video Music Award for Best Male Video in 1996.

In 2001, Hanft released his second feature film Southlander at South by Southwest. The film was made from a ten page story by Ross Harris and Steve Hanft.  

In 2011, Hanft released his third feature film, a music documentary Return of the Rub-a-Dub Style, about the original sound system reggae artists performing in Los Angeles. The film screened at Anthology Film Archive in New York, and Don't Knock the Rock Film Festival, in Los Angeles, and was released to DVD in 2011 on the  Stones Throw Records website and Ernie B's Reggae site.

Hanft also plays in bands, including Loser, Liquor Cabinet, Sexy Death Soda, and April March.

References

  6. https://www.youtube.com/user/StevenHanftFlims

1966 births
Living people
American film directors
American music video directors
California Institute of the Arts alumni